Grafton may refer to:

Places

Australia
 Grafton, New South Wales

Canada
 Grafton, New Brunswick
 Grafton, Nova Scotia
 Grafton, Ontario

England
 Grafton, Cheshire
 Grafton, Herefordshire
Grafton, North Yorkshire
 Grafton, Oxfordshire
 Grafton, Shropshire
 Grafton, Wiltshire
 Grafton, Worcestershire
 Grafton Manor, Worcestershire
 Grafton Flyford, Worcestershire
 Grafton Regis, Northamptonshire
 Grafton Underwood, Northamptonshire
 Ardens Grafton, Warwickshire
 Temple Grafton, Warwickshire
 The Honour of Grafton, a collection of manors in Northamptonshire

Ireland
 Grafton Street, Dublin

New Zealand
 Grafton, New Zealand, an inner city suburb of the city of Auckland

Sierra Leone
 Grafton, Sierra Leone

United States

Localities
 Knights Landing, California, formerly Grafton
 Grafton, Illinois
 Grafton, Indiana
 Grafton, Iowa
 Grafton, Kansas
 Grafton, Massachusetts
 Grafton (MBTA station)
 Grafton, Nebraska
 Grafton, New Hampshire
 Grafton, New York
 Grafton, North Dakota
 Grafton, Ohio
 Grafton, Utah, a ghost town
 Grafton, Vermont, a New England town
 Grafton (CDP), Vermont, the central village in the town
 Grafton, Virginia
 Grafton, West Virginia
 Grafton, Wisconsin, a village
 Grafton (town), Wisconsin, adjacent to the village

Counties
 Grafton County, New Hampshire

Townships

 Grafton Township, McHenry County, Illinois
 Grafton Township, Sibley County, Minnesota
 Grafton Township, Fillmore County, Nebraska
 Grafton Township, Walsh County, North Dakota
 Grafton Township, Lorain County, Ohio

Companies 
 Grafton (publisher), a British paperback book imprint, active 1981–1993
 Grafton Architects, comprising architects Shelley McNamara and Yvonne Farrell 
 Grafton Cinema, 1911–1973
 Grafton Entertainment, a record label
 Grafton Group, an Ireland-based builders merchants business.

Ships 
HMS Grafton (1679), a 70-gun third-rate ship of the line launched in 1679, rebuilt in 1700, and captured by the French in 1707
HMS Grafton (1709), a 70-gun third-rate launched in 1709, rebuilt in 1725 and broken up in 1744
HMS Grafton (1750), a 70-gun third-rate launched in 1750 and sold in 1767
HMS Grafton (1771), a 74-gun third-rate launched in 1771
HMS Grafton (1892), an Edgar-class cruiser launched in 1892 and broken up in 1920
HMS Grafton (H89), a G-class destroyer launched in 1935 and torpedoed in 1940
HMS Grafton (F51), a Blackwood-class (Type 14) frigate launched in 1957 and broken up in 1971
HMS Grafton (F80), a Type 23 frigate
USS Grafton (APA-109), a Bayfield-class attack transport launched in 1944 and scrapped in 1974
Grafton (ship), a schooner wrecked on the Auckland Islands in 1864
SS John Grafton, used by Finnish exiles to smuggle arms into Russian-ruled Finland in 1905

Other uses 
 Grafton (name)
 Duke of Grafton
Grafton Galleries, an art gallery that existed in Mayfair, London.
 Grafton saxophone, a unique 1950s alto saxophone constructed mainly from plastic

See also 
 Grafton High School (disambiguation)
 New Grafton, Nova Scotia